Scotorythra macrosoma is a moth of the family Geometridae. It was first described by Edward Meyrick in 1899. It is endemic to the Hawaiian islands of Kauai, Molokai, Maui, and Hawaii.

Larvae have been reared from leaves of Ricinus species.

External links

M
Endemic moths of Hawaii
Biota of Hawaii (island)
Biota of Kauai
Biota of Maui